Local Route 32 Daejeon–Mungyeong Line is a local route of South Korea that connects Yuseong District, Daejeon to Mungyeong, North Gyeongsang.

History
The route was originally planned in 1994 as an extension of National Route 32 from Daejeon to Jeomchon, but due to a lack of funding, the route was instead designated as a state-funded local route on 19 July 1996.

Stopovers
 Daejeon
 Yuseong-gu - Daedeok-gu
 North Chungcheong Province
 Cheongju - Goesan County
 North Gyeongsang Province
 Sangju
 North Chungcheong Province
 Goesan County
 North Gyeongsang Province
 Sangju - Mungyeong

Major intersections 

 (■): Motorway
IS: Intersection, IC: Interchange

Daejeon

North Chungcheong Province

North Gyeongsang Province

See also 
 Roads and expressways in South Korea
 Transportation in South Korea

References

External links 
 MOLIT South Korean Government Transport Department

32
Roads in North Chungcheong
Roads in North Gyeongsang
Roads in Daejeon